Magdalena del Mar, commonly known simply as Magdalena, is a seaside district of the Lima Province in Peru and one of the districts that comprise the city of Lima. Its current mayor is Francis Allison Oyague. Magdalena was officially established as a district on May 10, 1920.

Geography
With a total land area of 3.61 km², Magdalena borders the districts of San Miguel on the west, Pueblo Libre and Jesús María on the north, San Isidro on the east, and the Pacific Ocean on the south.

For more than fifty years, the eastern border of the district has been disputed with neighboring San Isidro. A judge ordered the councils of both districts to deposit the money of the affected areas' taxpayers in the National Bank of Peru until this long-standing conflict is resolved.

Transportation
The main avenues that connect the district with the rest of the city are the Ejercito Avenue, the Brasil Avenue, the Javier Prado Avenue, the Juan de Aliaga Avenue and the Sucre Avenue.

There are many bus routes operated by private companies that go through the district, however, the main publicly owned bus lines are the 201, 202, 204 and 209 line from the Corredor Rojo.

Demographics
According to a 2002 estimate by the INEI, the district has 52,976 inhabitants and a population density of 14,674.8 persons/km².

See also 
 Administrative divisions of Peru

References

External links

  Municipalidad Distrital de Magdalena del Mar - Magdalena del Mar District council official website

Districts of Lima